John F. Dunlap  (September 11, 1922 – March 7, 2022) was an American politician who served in the California legislature, with his 1974–1978 Senate term (he was defeated for re-election by Jim Nielsen) preceded by service in the Assembly from 1967 to 1974. During World War II he served in the United States Army. He died at his home in Napa, California, on March 7, 2022, at the age of 99.

References

External links
Senator From Napa - John Dunlaps's Homepage

1922 births
2022 deaths
People from Napa, California
Politicians from San Jose, California
Military personnel from California
United States Army personnel of World War II
Democratic Party California state senators
Democratic Party members of the California State Assembly
20th-century American politicians